Mark Richard Price (born 20 April 1960) is a former English cricketer.  Price was a right-handed batsman who bowled slow left-arm orthodox.  He was born at Liverpool, Lancashire.

Price made his first-class debut for Glamorgan against Gloucestershire in the 1984 County Championship.  He made sixteen further first-class appearances for the Welsh county, the last of which came against Sussex in the 1985 County Championship.  In his seventeen first-class matches, he took 19 wickets at an average of 42.42, with best figures of 4/97.  With the bat, he scored 144 runs at an average of 16.00, with a high score of 36.  He made his List A debut for the county against Derbyshire in the 1985 John Player Special League.  He made ten further List A appearances for Glamorgan during the 1985 season, the last of which came against Sussex.  In his eleven List A appearances, he took 5 wickets at an average of 38.00, with best figures of 3/22.  With the bat, he scored 59runs at an average of 9.83, with a high score of 22.  He left Glamorgan at the end of that season.

Price also played in the Lancashire League for Ramsbottom Cricket Club between 1977 and 2003.

References

External links
Mark Price at ESPNcricinfo
Mark Price at CricketArchive

1960 births
Living people
Cricketers from Liverpool
English cricketers
Glamorgan cricketers